Edward Charles Pickering (July 19, 1846 – February 3, 1919) was an American astronomer and physicist and the older brother of William Henry Pickering. Along with Carl Vogel, Pickering discovered the first spectroscopic binary stars.  He wrote Elements of Physical Manipulations (2 vol., 1873–76).

Personal life 
Pickering was born at 43 Bowdoin Street in Boston, Massachusetts, on July 19, 1846, to a distinguished, cultivated family consisting of his brother, William Henry Pickering, father, Edward Pickering, and his mother, Charlotte Hammond. Edward's brother, William, was a graduate of MIT and professor of physics and astronomy. Edward was interested in the stars as a boy and constructed his own telescope by the age of 12. Pickering enjoyed his work at the observatory, but he was also enjoyed mountain climbing and bicycling in earlier days and later he was an interested spectator of football games. He was co-founder and first president of the Appalachian Mountain Club. He was also a lover of classic music. During the first world war he was busy trying to devise useful applications to win the war. The Pickering Polaris Attachment was a device used to determine the range of guns. In 1874, Pickering married Lizzie Wadsworth Sparks, whose father was formerly the President of Harvard. Mrs. Pickering died in 1906, and Edward died in 1919.

Education
Pickering was educated at Boston Latin School, and then studied at the Lawrence Scientific School at Harvard (now known as the Harvard John A. Paulson School of Engineering and Applied Sciences), where he received his Bachelor of Science (BS) degree in 1865.

Career and research

Immediately upon graduating from Harvard he was hired as an instructor of mathematics there, and a year later he moved to the Massachusetts Institute of Technology to be an assistant professor of physics. Two years later, he was made Thayer Professor of Physics. During the 10 years he was there, he created the first physics lab in America that was designed for students to publish their own findings and research. Pickering named this lab the Rogers Laboratory of Physics and pronounced himself Director of the Laboratory. Later, he served as director of Harvard College Observatory (HCO) from 1877 to his death in 1919, where he made great leaps forward in the gathering of stellar spectra through the use of photography.

Shortly after the death of college doctor and amateur astronomer Henry Draper, an opportunity presented itself for Pickering. Draper's death left the incompletion of his work studying astronomy using photography. Draper had no children to carry on and finish his legacy, so his wife, Mary Anna Draper, planned on finishing his work. Pickering wrote a letter to Mrs. Draper "...pray recollect that if I can in any way advise or aid you, I shall be doing but little to repay Dr. Draper for a friendship which I shall always value, but which can never be replaced." Mrs. Draper urgently responded and soon dropped off her husband's work to Pickering. Pickering concluded that Draper's use of photography in astronomy was very promising opposed to the traditional method of observation and recording using one's eye through instruments. In 1884, a paper on such observations was published with the author "the late Henry Draper." After receiving criticism from Dr. William Huggins, a friend of Dr. Draper, Pickering began to hire more assistants to strengthen Draper's findings. This consequently also strengthened and contributed to Harvard Computers.  

In 1882 he started his appeals for international variable star observations. This was met with opposition, but eventually such a cooperation was realized in the Variable Star Section of the British Astronomical Association and the American Association of Variable Star Observers (AAVSO). Pickering had a good relationship with the AAVSO and received a gold paper knife with precious stones.

In 1882, Pickering developed a method to photograph the spectra of multiple stars simultaneously by putting a large prism in front of the photographic plate. Using this method, Pickering and his team captured images of over 220,000 stars. This immense amount of photographic research has provided scientists for decades with a seemingly endless library containing the history of every visible star's movements. It is said that this research weighs 120 tons due to the size of photographic plates.

He also, along with Williamina Fleming and Annie Jump Cannon designed a stellar classification system based on an alphabetic system for spectral classes that was first known as the Harvard Stellar Classification and became the basis for the Henry Draper Catalog.

In 1896, Pickering published observations of previously unknown lines in the spectra of the star ζ-Puppis.  These lines became known as the Pickering series (or the Pickering–Fowler series) and Pickering attributed them to hydrogen in 1897.  Alfred Fowler gave the same attribution to similar lines that he observed in a hydrogen-helium mixture in 1912.  Analysis by Niels Bohr included in his 'trilogy' on atomic structure argued that the spectral lines arose from ionized helium, He+, and not from hydrogen.  Fowler was initially-skeptical but was ultimately convinced that Bohr was correct, and by 1915 "spectroscopists had transferred [the Pickering series] definitively [from hydrogen] to helium."   Bohr's theoretical work on the Pickering series had demonstrated the need for "a re-examination of problems that seemed already to have been solved within classical theories" and provided important confirmation for his atomic theory.

Pickering is credited for making the Harvard College Observatory known and respected around the world, and it continues today to be a well-respected observatory and program.

Harvard Computers 
The Harvard College Observatory was becoming a premiere observatory in the world and with it came the demand for more assistants. These assistants were critical for taking notes, running calculations and performing analytics. College educated women from around the country offered to work for the Harvard Observatory unpaid to gain experience or until proving their value to be paid. During this time, Pickering recruited over 80 women to work for him, including Annie Jump Cannon, Henrietta Swan Leavitt, Antonia Maury, and Florence Cushman. It was very unusual for such an accomplished scientist to work with this many women, but it has been said that he "became so exasperated with his male assistant's inefficiency, that even his maid could do a better job of copying and computing". These women, the Harvard Computers (also described as "Pickering's Harem" by the male scientific community at the time), made several important discoveries at HCO.  Leavitt's discovery of the period-luminosity relationship for Cepheids, published by Pickering, would prove the foundation for the modern understanding of cosmological distances.

Pickering's treatment of women, during his time, was considered better than most. It is true that they were underpaid compared to their male counterparts and were not given credit nearly as often, but his willingness to include them in the world of astronomy paved the way for many great female scientists and leaders. This aided to the observatory's funding through fellowships and the procurement of women including alumnus and professors aiding in the creation of Harvard Computers.

Death and legacy
Pickering was the fourth and longest-running director of HCO, serving for 42 years. On February 3, 1919, Pickering unexpectedly died from pneumonia and heart complications after being ill for around ten days. He died while holding the position of director of the University Observatory continuing an odd 42 year tradition of HCO Directors dying in office.  After his death, Solon Bailey served as interim director. Pickering's friends and colleges would remember him for his great ability, originality, initiative, and warm-heartedness. Pickering would be remembered by the world for his contribution to astronomical photography, advancement of astronomical discoveries, and his progressive view of women.

Although today his treatment of women is associated with a negative connotation, he was known during the time to give women more equal treatment than most. Doing so paved the way for many more women to become interested and involved in astronomy. Pickering's work with using glass plates to photograph the sky was the start of major technological advances for astronomical photography. Although glass plates are no longer used, his work led to modern uses of charged coupled devices in the 1970s.

Pickering is interred in Mount Auburn Cemetery in Massachusetts.

Honors and awards

His awards and honors include:
Pickering was the youngest person to be elected a Member of the National Academy of Sciences in 1873 when he was 26 years old.
Fellow of the American Academy of Arts and Sciences (1867)
Gold Medal of the Royal Astronomical Society (1886 and 1901)
Valz Prize of the French Academy of Sciences (1888)
Henry Draper Medal from the National Academy of Sciences (1888)
Bruce Medal (1908)
Prix Jules Janssen, the highest award of the Société astronomique de France, the French astronomical society (1908)
LL. D. (honorary degree) at six American universities and two doctor degrees at foreign universities
Rumford Medal
Pour le Merite

The following are named in his honor:
The crater, Pickering lunar crater 
The crater, Pickering martian crater
Asteroid 784 Pickeringia
Part of the Veil Nebula, Pickering's Triangle 
Mount Pickering, a mountain in California

Publications
(1873–76) Elements of physical manipulation New York: Hurd & Houghton OCLC 16078533
(1882) A plan for securing observations of the variable stars Cambridge: J. Wilson and Son OCLC 260332440
(1886) An investigation in stellar photography Cambridge: J. Wilson and Son OCLC 15790725
(1891) Preparation and discussion of the Draper catalogue Cambridge: J. Wilson and Son OCLC 3492105
(1903) Plan for the endowment of astronomical research Cambridge: Astronomical observatory of Harvard College OCLC 30005226

References

External links

 
 
 
 
 Women Astronomers at Harvard at the Turn of the Century

Obituaries
  AN 208 (1919) 133/134
 JRASC 13 (1919) 160
 MNRAS 80 (1920) 360

 PASP 31 (1919) 73

1846 births
1919 deaths
Harvard University alumni
Harvard University staff
American astronomers
American astrophysicists
Boston Latin School alumni
Recipients of the Gold Medal of the Royal Astronomical Society
Fellows of the American Academy of Arts and Sciences
Members of the United States National Academy of Sciences
Foreign Members of the Royal Society
Recipients of the Bruce Medal
People from Boston
Members of the Royal Society of Sciences in Uppsala